"" (Alone to God in the highest be glory) is an early Lutheran hymn, with text and melody attributed to Nikolaus Decius. With the reformers intending church service in German, it was intended as a German version of the Gloria part of the Latin mass, used in almost every service. Decius wrote three stanzas, probably in 1523, while a fourth was added, probably by Joachim Slüter.

"" is included in many German hymnals, including the current Protestant hymnal Evangelisches Gesangbuch and (in three stanzas) in the Catholic hymnal Gotteslob. Catherine Winkworth translated it to "All glory be to God on high".

History 

With the Reformation, the traditional Latin of Christian church services was changed to German. "" is a paraphrase of the Latin Gloria from the mass liturgy. The oldest prints of the hymn do not mention an author, but it is believed that it was written in Low German by Nikolaus Decius in 1523, which makes it one of the earliest songs of the Reformation. The melody, Zahn No. 4457, is adapted from the Gloria of the mass for Easter in Gregorian chant, Lux et origo (GL 114).

Early publications 
"Aleyne God yn der Höge sy eere" is the first Low German version of the later "" published in 's Geystlyke leder (Rostock, 1531). The first print in High German appeared in a hymnal by Valentin Schumann in Leipzig in 1539. Text and melody of the hymn were published together for the first time in 's Kirchengesenge Deudtsch (Magdeburg 1545).

Authorship 
In 17th-century Leipzig hymnals the German text of "" was attributed to Nikolaus Selnecker. In his church history of Braunschweig, published in five volumes between 1707 and 1720,  refers to a Latin document from 1600, which named Decius as the author of text and melody of both "" and "". The creation of hymns by Decius is dated 1522/23, before the first publications of hymns by Martin Luther (1524): thus these hymns belong to the earliest of the Reformation.

Text and translation 
"" is in four stanzas of seven lines each. The following text is taken from the Protestant hymnal Evangelisches Gesangbuch which has the hymn as EG 179. The Catholic hymnal Gotteslob has only the first three stanzas, as GL 170, and a slight change in the rhythm. Both hymnals note 1523 as the year of writing. Catherine Winkworth translated the hymn to "All glory be to God on high, who hath our race befriended", which appears in 95 hymnals.

Hymn tune and musical settings

Organ settings 
As a hymn usually sung every Sunday, "" was often the basis for chorale preludes. Among those by Johann Sebastian Bach there are three in Clavier-Übung III (BWV 675, BWV 676 and BWV 677), and three others in the Great Eighteen Chorale Preludes (BWV 662, BWV 663 and BWV 664), and BWV 711 in Kirnberger Chorale Preludes. Other composers from the 18th century or earlier set the hymn tune for organ including Wilhelm Friedemann Bach, Georg Böhm, Christian Geist, Johann Peter Kellner and Melchior Schildt.

Max Reger composed two chorale preludes, the first of his 52 chorale preludes, Op. 67 in 1902, and No. 2 of his 30 small chorale preludes, Op. 135a, in 1914. Charles Tomlinson Griffes wrote an organ piece in 1910. Sigfrid Karg-Elert included a setting as No. 23 of his 66 Chorale improvisations for organ, published in 1909. Ernst Pepping used it for the Gloria of his Deutsche Choralmesse, a six-part setting of 1928. Contemporary organ settings were written by Aivars Kalējs, among others.

Vocal settings 
Bach set the hymn as a four-part chorale, (BWV 260).

Felix Mendelssohn included a setting of the hymn in his oratorio Paulus, as No. 3, the first chorale, following the overture and a chorus.

References

Cited sources

Further reading 
 
 Ludger Stühlmeyer: Die Kirchenlieder des Hofers Nicolaus Decius. In: Curia sonans. Die Musikgeschichte der Stadt Hof. Eine Studie zur Kultur Oberfrankens. Von der Gründung des Bistums Bamberg bis zur Gegenwart. (dissertation.) Bayerische Verlagsanstalt, Heinrichs-Verlag Bamberg 2010, pp. 110–112, 135–137, 357–358.

External links 
 
 , "Allein Gott in der Höh sei Ehr" (BWV 260), sung by the 

16th-century hymns in German
Lutheran hymns
1523 works